Lajos Korózs (bron in Eger, Hungary on September 7, 1958) is a Hungarian sociologist and politician. He is a member of parliament in the National Assembly of Hungary (Országgyűlés) since May 2018. He currently serves as the Chairman house committee on Welfare in the Hungarian parliament.

References 

Living people
1958 births
People from Eger
Hungarian sociologists
Members of the National Assembly of Hungary (2018–2022)
Hungarian Socialist Party politicians